Carl Plötz (1814 – 12 August 1886, Greifswald) was a German entomologist who specialised in Lepidoptera and in particular Hesperiidae.
He was a member of the Entomological Society of Stettin. He wrote (from 1879 onwards)

   various dates; (1879)
   41: Heterocera text Rhopalocera text (1880)
   55(3):1-22, (1880)
  ; 40 (7-9): 406-411 (1881)
  , 42 : 500-504; 43 (1882, but published in 1881)
   26:71-82, 253-266 (1882)
   45 (4-6): 151-166 (1884) 
  , 17: 485-528 (1886).

References
Friese, G. 1959: Die Erforschung der mecklenburgischen Schmetterlings-Fauna. (Ein Beitrag zur Geschichte der Entomologie in Deutschland). Arch. Freunde Naturgesch. Mecklenb. 5 226-264 248 
Mac Lachlan, R. 1886: [Plötz, C.] Proc. Ent. Soc. London 1886 LXX   
Musgrave, A. 1932: Bibliography of Australian Entomology 1775 - 1930.Sydney

German lepidopterists
1814 births
1886 deaths